The York Civic Centre is a government building in Toronto, Ontario, Canada. It is located at 2700 Eglinton Avenue West in the neighbourhood of Beechborough-Greenbrook. The building is used by the Toronto West Court Office and was the seat of the municipal government of the former city of York, Ontario.

York's Civic Centre does not have a public square like several other civic centres in Toronto, but is located next to Coronation Park and York Memorial Collegiate Institute. There is a time capsule present on the grounds, adjacent to the city of York's war memorial. It is intended to be opened in 2193, Toronto's quadricentennial anniversary.

See also
 East York Civic Centre
 Etobicoke Civic Centre
 Scarborough Civic Centre
 North York Civic Centre
 Metro Hall
 Toronto City Hall

Municipal buildings in Toronto
Former seats of local government